Ola Mohamed Tarek Al Said Abou Zekry (born 20 June 1987) is a former professional tennis player from Egypt.

Abou Zekry has career-high WTA rankings of 441 in singles, achieved on 20 July 2015, and 440 doubles, set on 29 February 2016. In her career, she won two singles titles and nine doubles titles on the ITF Circuit.

Playing for the Egypt Fed Cup team, Abou Zekry has a win–loss record of 7–15.

ITF Circuit finals

Singles: 6 (2 titles, 4 runner-ups)

Doubles: 32 (9 titles, 23 runner-ups)

External links
 
 
 
 University of New Mexico profile

1987 births
Living people
Egyptian female tennis players
Sportspeople from Cairo
New Mexico Lobos athletes
African Games gold medalists for Egypt
African Games medalists in tennis
College women's tennis players in the United States
Competitors at the 2015 African Games